Heavy oil may refer to:

 Coal tar creosote, a wood preservative and waterproofing agent
 Diesel fuel
 Fuel oil that contains residual oil left over from petroleum distillation
 Heavy crude oil, viscous crude oil